Andrea Giannini (born 18 December 1976) is a retired Italian pole vaulter.

Biography
He won the bronze medal at the 1997 Mediterranean Games, and the gold medal at the 2001 Mediterranean Games. He finished tenth at the 2003 Summer Universiade, and competed at the 1997 World Indoor Championships and the 1997 World Championships without reaching the final. He became Italian champion in 1997 (indoor) and 1998.

His personal best jump was 5.65 metres, achieved in July 1997 in Milan. After retirement, he became a sport journalist and athletics coach. He coaches the paralympic champion Oscar Pistorius during his trainings in Italy.

National titles
He has won 2 times the individual national championship.
2 wins in the pole vault (1997 indoor and 1998 outdoor)

See also
Italian all-time lists -Pole vault

References

External links
 

1976 births
Athletics competitors of Fiamme Gialle
Living people
Italian male pole vaulters
Mediterranean Games gold medalists for Italy
Mediterranean Games bronze medalists for Italy
Athletes (track and field) at the 1997 Mediterranean Games
Athletes (track and field) at the 2001 Mediterranean Games
World Athletics Championships athletes for Italy
Mediterranean Games medalists in athletics
20th-century Italian people
21st-century Italian people